Ximena Huilipán Muñoz (born September 19, 1986) is a Chilean model and actress of Mapuche descent.

Career 
At 14 years of age, Huilipán won the Elite Model Look Chile 2002 contest. She was discovered by Dominican fashion designer Oscar de la Renta for whom she modeled after having won the Elite Model Look Chile 2002. During her early career she also modeled for Carolina Herrera and was cast in a minor role in Jorge Olguín's movie Sangre eterna. Later she moved further into an actor career playing a role as Lautaro's wife in a historical movie about the Arauco War between Spaniards and Mapuches. She has been called "the Mapuche model" several times in the written press, but does not embody the stereotypical physical Mapuche characteristics.

Filmography 
 Eternal Blood aka Sangre Eterna (2002) - Vampire

See also 
 Caroline Ribeiro
 Bruna Tenório

References 

20th-century Mapuche people
21st-century Mapuche people
1986 births
Chilean people of Mapuche descent
Chilean female models
Chilean film actresses
Living people
Indigenous actors of the Americas
Mapuche women
21st-century Chilean women